NK Dubrava Tim Kabel is a Croatian football club based in the city of Zagreb. The club's biggest success was playing in 1.HNL in the 1993–94 season. The club gets its name from the eastern Zagreb neighborhood it plays in of Dubrava, and its sponsor, Tim Kabel, a supplier of cables.

History
The club was founded in 1945 by members of HAŠK, Građanska and Concordija football clubs, playing entirely in the lower leagues and undergoing a series of name changes.

In 1992, NK Dubrava hosted the Albania national football team in what was the only second appearance of a national team in Croatia. The game finished 0–0.

After winning the 1993 second division title, NK Dubrava appeared in the 1993–94 Prva HNL, the top flight of Croat football, but were relegated after finishing 17th of 18 teams. They did manage to defeat Dinamo Zagreb 1–0. The club was led by future Croatia national team coach Ante Čačić until 1993.

In 2013, Dubrava reorganised their board of directors. They are known for their youth programs and host a youth tournament every year.

Current squad

References

External links

Football clubs in Croatia
Association football clubs established in 1945
Football clubs in Zagreb
1945 establishments in Croatia